Bartolomeo Russo (1866–1941) was a notable New Zealand fisherman, horticulturist and farmer. He was born in Stromboli, Italy in about 1866.

References

1866 births
1941 deaths
New Zealand farmers
New Zealand fishers
New Zealand horticulturists
Italian emigrants to New Zealand
People of Sicilian descent